Paranoia is a thought process that typically includes persecutory delusions.

Paranoia may also refer to:

Books
 Paranoia (Hermans book),  a 1953 short story collection by the Dutch writer Willem Frederik Hermans
 Paranoia (novel), a novel by Joseph Finder

Film and television
 Paranoia (1967 film), a Dutch drama
 Paranoia (1969 film), originally titled Orgasmo, an Italian drama directed by Umberto Lenzi
 Paranoia (1970 film) (released in the U.S. as A Quiet Place to Kill, to avoid confusion with Orgasmo), an Italian film, also directed by Umberto Lenzi
 Paranoia, a 1998 cable TV American thriller starring Sally Kirkland
 Paranoia (2013 film), a thriller starring Gary Oldman, Liam Hemsworth and Harrison Ford
 Paranoia (2021 film), an Indonesian thriller drama film
 Paranoia  (TV series), a 2016 eight-part British crime drama
 Paranoia (game show), a 2000 live, interactive American game show
 "Paranoia" (Brooklyn Nine-Nine), an episode
 "Paranoia" (Law & Order), an episode of Law & Order
 "Paranoia" (Law & Order: Special Victims Unit), an episode of Law & Order: Special Victims Unit

Games
 Paranoia (role-playing game), a 1984 dystopian science-fiction role-playing game
Paranoia (video game), a 1995 Czech videogame

Music
  Paranoia (album), 1999 album by Nikolai Noskov
 Paranoia: A True Story, 2017 EP by Dave East
 Paranoia 2, 2018 mixtape by Dave East
Songs
 "Paranoia" (A Day to Remember song), 2016
 "Paranoia" (Eiko Shimamiya song), 2009
 "Paranoia", by 180 (Naoki Maeda) from the video game Dance Dance Revolution
 "Paranoia", by Hawkwind from Hawkwind "Paranoia", by Lovebites from Glory, Glory, to the World "Paranoia", by Royce da 5'9" from Independent's Day "Paranoia", by Sam Roberts from We Were Born in a Flame "Paranoia", by Soulfly from Conquer "Paranoia", by White Ash from Quit or Quiet "Paranoia, Paranoia", by Bauhaus, a B-side of the single "Lagartija Nick"

 See also 
 cdparanoia, a CD-ripping tool
 Paranoia 1.0'', a 2004 science-fiction film
 Paranoiac (film), a horror movie
 Paranoid (disambiguation)
 "Paranoimia," a 1986 song by the Art of Noise

de:Paranoid
hu:Paranoid (egyértelműsítő lap)
no:Paranoid (andre betydninger)
tr:Paranoid